1989 World Cup may refer to:
 1989 World Cup (men's golf)
 1989 World Cup (snooker)
 1989 IAAF World Cup